The list of college athletic programs in Rhode Island below is in tabular format, with columns arranged left to right in the following order: team name, school name, school location, conference, and sport sponsorship with football, basketball (men and women), baseball, softball, ice hockey (men and women), and soccer (men and women) listed. Different team name for a specific sport within a school are noted separately below the table.

NCAA

Division I

Division III

NJCAA

See also 
List of NCAA Division I institutions
List of NCAA Division II institutions
List of NCAA Division III institutions
List of NAIA institutions
List of USCAA institutions
List of NCCAA institutions

References

Rhode Island
College sports in Rhode Island
College athletic programs
College athletic programs